The Initiation is the fifth solo studio album by rapper, X-Raided.  It was released on February 27, 2001 for his new label, Mad Man Records and featured production from X-Raided, Big Hollis and James "Razor" Brown. The Initiation made it to #39 on the Independent Albums chart.

Track listing
"Rip off the Roof"- 4:00  
"All My Dogs"- 3:37  
"Consider Me Dead"- 4:04  
"Game Official"- 4:07  
"Let It Be Known"- 4:05  
"Gangsta, Gangsta"- 4:04  
"Mash 4 Cash"- 3:48  
"Thug Love"- 4:20  
"No Fear"- 4:10  
"Regardless"- 4:29  
"Smoke N Drink"- 5:00  
"Stacc Chips"- 4:13  
"What Yall Want"- 4:52  
"Why Do They Die"- 3:37  
"Fuccyoutoo"- 3:53

2001 albums
X-Raided albums
Albums produced by Big Hollis